This article shows all participating team squads at the 2017 Asian Women's Volleyball Championship, held in the Philippines from 9 to 17 August 2017.

Pool A

The following is the Filipino roster in the 2017 Asian Championship.

Head Coach: Francis Vicente

The following is the Kazakhstani roster in the 2017 Asian Championship.

Head Coach: Shapran Vyacheslav

The following is the Hong Kong roster in the 2017 Asian Championship.

Head coach: Lam Chun-kwok

Pool B

The following is the Chinese roster in the 2017 Asian Championship.

Head coach: Bao Zhuang

The following is the Japanese roster in the 2017 Asian Championship.

Head coach: Kumi Nakada

The following is the Australian roster in the 2017 Asian Championship.

Head coach: Shannon Winzer

Pool C

The following is the Korean roster in the 2017 Asian Championship.

Head coach: Hong Sung-jin

The following is the Vietnamese roster in the 2017 Asian Championship.

Head Coach: Hidehiro Irisawa

The following is the Sri Lankan roster for the 2017 Asian Championship.

Head coach: Sumith Jayalal

The following is the New Zealand roster for the 2017 Asian Championship.

Head coach: Alisfer McKenzie

Pool D

The following is the Thai roster in the 2017 Asian Championship.

Head coach: Danai Sriwatcharamethakul

The following is the Taiwanese roster in the 2017 Asian Championship.

Head Coach: Lin Min-hui

The following is the Iranian roster in the 2017 Asian Championship.

Head Coach: Mirmostafa Shojaei

The following is the Maldivian roster in the 2017 Asian Championship.

Head Coach: Mohamed Nadheem

References

External links

Asian women's volleyball championships
Voll
Asian Women's Volleyball Championship
International volleyball competitions hosted by the Philippines
Sports in Laguna (province)
Muntinlupa